John William Mew (30 March 1889 – 16 January 1963) was an English footballer who played as a goalkeeper.

Club career
Born in Sunderland, he attended Marley Hill Council School where he first played football. In July 1912, he was signed by Manchester United. He won a Central League Championship medal in 1913. He stayed with United until 1926 when he moved to Barrow, where he spent one season before retiring. During his United career, he made 199 appearances, only missing four League matches in four seasons.

International career
He made one appearance for England against Ireland on 23 October 1920.

Coaching career
In 1927, he became a trainer-coach for TSV Lyra in Belgium. In June 1928, he became a coach for Lima.

Personal life
He was married and lived in Stretford. His only son, Allen Cyril, was in the R.A.F. during the Second World War and was killed while training young pilots.

References

External links

1889 births
1963 deaths
Footballers from Sunderland
English footballers
England international footballers
Association football goalkeepers
Blaydon United F.C. players
Manchester United F.C. players
Barrow A.F.C. players
English Football League players
English Football League representative players